Salinas de Guaranda, also known as Salinas de Tomabela, is an Ecuadorian village whose name derives from the salt mines that drove its economy prior to the 1970s.

Currently, it's co-op economy, based on the Quechua concept of mingas or minkas, is known for the production of chocolate, cheese and salamis, although they continue to explore new products.

References

External links
 Salinerito
 

Populated places in Bolívar Province (Ecuador)